Lynda Tait Randle (born February 7, 1962), is an alto singer of southern gospel music.

Early years
The daughter of Nate and Maxine Tait, Randle grew up in the inner city of Washington, DC. Her bi-vocational minister father drove a cab. Public schools provided her education through the eighth grade, after which she attended Riverdale Baptist School. Her choir teacher there persuaded her to enhance her solo talents. In 1989 she graduated from Liberty University.

Career
Randle is known as a Gaither Homecoming artist since she was recruited by Bill Gaither in 1998. She also markets a number of singing videos featuring her mellow alto voice in gospel music, particularly southern gospel.

She also heads Lynda Randle Ministries in Kansas City, Missouri. Randle on March 21, 2009, became one of the main artists featured by Feed the Children as a fundraising solicitation for contributions.

Randle wrote a children's book, Cab Driver’s Daughter, that is partly autobiographical.

Personal life
Randle and her husband, Michael, live in Liberty, Missouri, where they settled after their 1989 marriage. They have two daughters, Patience and Joy. Randle has four sisters. Her brother is Michael Tait of dc Talk and Newsboys.

Recognition
Randle's A Tribute to Mahalia Jackson recording won a GMA Dove Award for traditional gospel album.

Discography 

 2003Timeless: Favorites From the Homecoming Series, Gaither Gospel Series 
 2004A Tribute to Mahaila Jackson
 2005God On the Mountain
 2005Christmas
 2007Hymns, Gaither Gospel Series
 2007Lynda Randle Live, Gaither Gospel Series
 2008Woman After God's Own Heart
 2009I'm Free
 2011Timeless 2, Gaither Gospel Series
 2012'Til the Storm Passes By, Gaither Gospel Series
 2013Ageless Hymns: Songs of Hope, Gaither Gospel Series
 2015Ageless Hymns: Songs of Peace, Gaither Gospel Series
 2016Ageless Hymns: Songs of Joy, Gaither Gospel Series

References

External links
 

1962 births
Living people
20th-century Christians
21st-century Christians
African-American Christians
American contraltos
American gospel singers
Musicians from Kansas City, Missouri
Singers from Washington, D.C.
Singers from Missouri
Southern gospel performers
20th-century African-American women singers
21st-century African-American women singers